The Maha Thiri Thudhamma   (from ) is an honorary award given to those  who have served in the military or the civil service since the 1948 independence. In the past, this title was given to the President, Chief Justice; Speaker of the Hluttaw, the Commander-in-Chief and Ministers. One of the first women to win the title in Myanmar was Khin Kyi, who obtained it in 1951.

List of Maha Thiri Thudhamma recipients

Daw Khin Kyi - a Burmese politician and diplomat, best known for her marriage to the country's leader, Aung San. They have four children, including Aung San Suu Kyi. She was born  in Myaungmya, an Irrawaddy Delta town, on 16 April 1912. 
Gen. Ne Win - a Burmese politician and military commander who served as Prime Minister of Burma. 
Saw Kyar Doe
President U Ba Oo
Bo Let Ya - a Burmese military officer and a member of the legendary Thirty Comrades.

See also
Thiri Thudhamma Thingaha
Pyidaungsu Sithu Thingaha
Salwe

References 

Orders, decorations, and medals of Myanmar